This is a list of adult nonfiction books that topped The New York Times Nonfiction Best Seller list in 1931.

This was the first year that the list was published, though it was not yet a national list. Throughout the 1930s the list reflected sales in the New York City area.

See also

 1931 in literature
 The New York Times Fiction Best Sellers of 1931
 Lists of The New York Times Fiction Best Sellers
 Lists of The New York Times Nonfiction Best Sellers
 Publishers Weekly list of bestselling novels in the United States in the 1930s

References

1931
.
1931 in the United States